Varnavino is the name of several urban and rural inhabited localities (urban-type settlements, work settlements, and villages) in Russia.

Urban localities
Varnavino, Nizhny Novgorod Oblast, a work settlement in Varnavinsky District of Nizhny Novgorod Oblast

Rural localities
Varnavino, Arkhangelsk Oblast, a village in Udimsky Selsoviet of Kotlassky District of Arkhangelsk Oblast
Varnavino, Smolensk Oblast, a village in Shapovskoye Rural Settlement of Demidovsky District of Smolensk Oblast
Varnavino, Vologda Oblast, a village in Timanovsky Selsoviet of Babushkinsky District of Vologda Oblast